Zum Kommunismus! ('For Communism!') was a Volga German communist newspaper. It was the organ of the Volga German regional committee of the Russian Young Communist League. It was published from Marxstadt between 1919 and 1920. D. Schmidt was the editor of Zum Kommunismus!

See also
Rote Jugend

References

German-language communist newspapers
Komsomol
Newspapers published in Russia
1919 establishments in Russia
1920 disestablishments in Russia